2012 Emmy Awards may refer to:

 64th Primetime Emmy Awards, the 2012 Emmy Awards ceremony that honored primetime programming during June 2011 – May 2012
 39th Daytime Emmy Awards, the 2012 Emmy Awards ceremony that honored daytime programming during 2011
 33rd Sports Emmy Awards, the 2012 Emmy Awards ceremony that honored sports programming during 2011
 40th International Emmy Awards, honoring international programming

Emmy Award ceremonies by year